= Life Paint =

High-visibility spray paint brand

Life Paint is the trade name of a highly-reflective spray paint developed by Volvo to increase the visibility of cyclists during trips after dark. It was developed in collaboration with Swedish reflective spray manufacturer 'Albedo 100', who previously marketed a similar paint for use on the coats of pets and horses. The paint lasts for about one week after use, but is easily washed off without damaging the surface to which it was applied. Although initially developed for the use of cyclists, it could also protect pedestrians.

It has been criticized by cycling advocates as victim blaming by shifting the onus from responsible driving or safer car design to vulnerable road-users who are injured by motor vehicles, even drawing a petition to retrofit Volvo vehicles with 'Life Paint'.
